Cefn Cribwr Football Club is a Welsh football team based in Cefn Cribwr, Bridgend County Borough, Wales. They play in the Ardal SW, which is in the third tier of the Welsh football league system.

History
Established in 1976 as Cefn Cribwr Boys Club, the club began playing in the Bridgend & District League and were back-to-back Premier Division champions in the 1986–87 and 1987–88 seasons.

They were founder members of the South Wales Senior League in the 1991–92 season, playing in the league until 2000. They again played in the Bridgend & District League, winning the Premier Division in 2013–14, and gaining promotion to South Wales Senior League for its final season in 2014–15. They joined the newly established South Wales Alliance League Division Two in 2015–16, and after finishing third in the 2016–17 season, were promoted to Division One, where they finished their first season in the division as champions, gaining promotion to the Premier Division.

Following the formation of a limited company in July 2021, the club's name was changed to Cefn Cribwr Football Club, to reflect "a club that was open to all". As a result of Cae Gof being deemed unsuitable for the Ardal Leagues, the club's first team will groundshare with Cambrian & Clydach Vale for the 2022–23 season, whilst improvements to the ground are made. The club's reserves and third teams will remain at Cae Gof. A successful crowdfunding campaign concluded in July 2022, raising the amount necessary to help the first team return to Cefn Cribwr.

Honours

League
South Wales Alliance League Premier Division
Runners-up: 2021–22
South Wales Alliance League Division One
Winners: 2017–18
South Wales Alliance League Division Two
Runners-up: 2016–17
Bridgend & District League Premier Division
Winners: 1986–87; 1987–88; 2013–14

Cup
W.T. John Open Cup
Winners: 1990–91; 2000–01; 2005–06; 2007–08; 2008–09; 2013–14

References

External links
 Official website
 South Wales Alliance League profile
 Facebook page
 Instagram account
 Twitter account

Football clubs in Wales
South Wales Alliance League clubs
South Wales Senior League clubs
Bridgend & District League clubs
Association football clubs established in 1976
Football clubs in Bridgend County Borough
1976 establishments in Wales
Ardal Leagues clubs